Valgma is a village in Tartu Parish, Tartu County in Estonia.

References

Villages in Tartu County